Monica Biama (born 24 March 1988) is a Kenyan female volleyball player. She is part of the Kenya women's national volleyball team. She participated at the 2015 FIVB Volleyball Women's World Cup, 2015 FIVB Volleyball World Grand Prix, and at the 2016 FIVB Volleyball World Grand Prix.

In 2017 she was in the Pipeline team in Cairo as they contested the Women's Africa Club Volleyball Championship.

Clubs 

  Kenya Pipeline

References

External links 

 Getty

1988 births
Living people
Kenyan women's volleyball players